Timothy Williams may refer to:

 Timothy Williams (author) (born 1946), British writer
 Timothy Williams (actor) (born 1967), American actor and screenwriter
 Timothy Williams (composer) (born 1966), British film composer for film, TV and video games
 Timothy Shaler Williams (1862–1930), American journalist and president of the Brooklyn Rapid Transit Company
 Timothy P. Williams, United States Army general
 Timothy Williams (computer programmer)
 Timothy Angus Williams, Canadian ambassador to Tunisia

See also 
 Tim Williams (disambiguation)